The 1867 Kaiapoi by-election was a by-election held on 5 July 1867 during the 4th New Zealand Parliament in the Canterbury electorate of .

The by-election was caused by the resignation of the incumbent MP Joseph Beswick on 24 April 1867.

The by-election was won by John Studholme. As there were no other candidates, he was declared duly elected.

Notes

Kaiapoi 1867
1867 elections in New Zealand
Politics of Canterbury, New Zealand
July 1867 events